Carlyle Airport  is located adjacent to Carlyle, Saskatchewan, Canada. On 25 June 2016, the Carlyle Airport was renamed the E.J. (Ted) Brady Regional Airport, as a tribute to the long serving mayor of Carlyle.

See also
List of airports in Saskatchewan

References

Registered aerodromes in Saskatchewan